Phytoextraction is a subprocess of phytoremediation in which plants remove dangerous elements or compounds from soil or water, most usually heavy metals, metals that have a high density and may be toxic to organisms even at relatively low concentrations. The heavy metals that plants extract are toxic to the plants as well, and the plants used for phytoextraction are known hyperaccumulators that sequester extremely large amounts of heavy metals in their tissues. Phytoextraction can also be performed by plants that uptake lower levels of pollutants, but due to their high growth rate and biomass production, may remove a considerable amount of contaminants from the soil.

Heavy metals and biological systems
Heavy metals can be a major problem for any biological organism as they may be reactive with a number of chemicals essential to biological processes.

They can also break apart other molecules into even more reactive species (such as reactive oxygen species), which also disrupt biological processes. These reactions deplete the concentration of important molecules and also produce dangerously reactive molecules such as the radicals O. and OH..

Non-hyperaccumulators also absorb some concentration of heavy metals, as many heavy metals are chemically similar to other metals that are essential to the plants' life.

The process
For a plant to extract a heavy metal from water or soil, five things need to happen.
 
 The metal must dissolve in something the plant roots can absorb.
 The plant roots must absorb the heavy metal.
 The plant must chelate the metal to both protect itself and make the metal more mobile (this can also happen before the metal is absorbed). Chelation is a process by which a metal is surrounded and chemically bonded to an organic compound. 
 The plant moves the chelated metal to a place to safely store it.
 Finally, the plant must adapt to any damage the metals cause during transportation and storage.

Dissolution
In their normal states, metals cannot be taken into any organism. They must be dissolved as an ion in solution to be mobile in an organism. Once the metal is mobile, it can either be directly transported over the root cell wall by a specific metal transporter or carried over by a specific agent. The plant roots mediate this process by secreting things that will capture the metal in the rhizosphere and then transport the metal over the cell wall. Some examples are: phytosiderophores, organic acids, or carboxylates If the metal is chelated at this point, then the plant does not need to chelate it later and the chelater serves as a case to conceal the metal from the rest of the plant. This is a way for a hyper-accumulator to protect itself from the toxic effects of poisonous metals.

Root absorption
The first thing that happens when a metal is absorbed is it binds to the root cell wall. The metal is then transported into the root. Some plants then store the metal through chelation or sequestration. Many specific transition metal ligands contributing to metal detoxification and transport are up-regulated in plants when metals are available in the rhizosphere. At this point the metal can be alone or already sequestered by a chelating agent or other compound. To get to the xylem, the metal must then pass through the root symplasm.

Root-to-shoot transport
The systems that transport and store heavy metals are the most critical systems in a hyper-accumulator because the heavy metals will damage the plant before they are stored.  
The root-to-shoot transport of heavy metals is strongly regulated by gene expression. The genes that code for metal transport systems in plants have been identified. These genes are expressed in both hyper-accumulating and non-hyper-accumulating plants. There is a large body of evidence that genes known to code for the transport systems of heavy metals are constantly over-expressed in hyper-accumulating plants when they are exposed to heavy metals. This genetic evidence suggests that hyper-accumulators overdevelop their metal transport systems. This may be to speed up the root-to-shoot process limiting the amount of time the metal is exposed to the plant systems before it is stored. Cadmium accumulation has been reviewed.
 
These transporters are known as heavy metal transporting ATPases (HMAs).
One of the most well-documented HMAs is HMA4, which belongs to the Zn/Co/Cd/Pb HMA subclass and is localized at xylem parenchyma plasma membranes. HMA4 is upregulated when plants are exposed to high levels of Cd and Zn, but it is downregulated in its non-hyperaccumulating relatives. Also, when the expression of HMA4 is increased there is a correlated increase in the expression of genes belonging to the ZIP (Zinc regulated transporter Iron regulated transporter Proteins) family. This suggests that the root-to-shoot transport system acts as a driving force of the hyper-accumulation by creating a metal deficiency response in roots.

Storage
Systems that transport and store heavy metals are the most critical systems in a hyper-accumulator, because heavy metals damage the plant before they are stored. Often in hyperaccumulators the heavy metals are stored in the leaves.

How phytoextraction can be useful

For plants
There are several theories to explain why it would be beneficial for a plant to do this. For example, the "elemental defence" hypothesis assumes that maybe predators will avoid eating hyperaccumulators because of the heavy metals. So far, scientists have not been able to determine a correlation.
In 2002 a study was done by the Department of Pharmacology at Bangabandhu Sheikh Mujib Medical University in Bangladesh that used water hyacinth to remove arsenic from water. This study proved that water could be completely purified of arsenic in a few hours and that the plant then could be used as animal feed, fire wood and many other practical purposes. Since water hyacinth is invasive, it is inexpensive to grow and extremely practical for this purpose.

See also 
 Biomining

References

Ecological restoration
Bioremediation
-